Sheila Bender is an American poet and essayist, best known for her popular books on writing instruction. She hosts a show on KPTZ in Port Townsend, WA.

Works
Bender's many books on writing include Creative Writing DeMystified, Writing and Publishing Personal Essays, Writing in a New Convertible with the Top Down, Keeping a Journal You Love, A Year in the Life: Journaling for Self-Discovery, The Writer's Journal: Forty Writer's and Their Journals, and  Perfect Phrases for College Application Essays.  Her memoir, A New Theology: Turning to Poetry in a Time of Grief, chronicles  how reading and writing poetry helped her cope after the loss of her 25-year-old son and find a way to live with love in the spirit of her son. Her newest collection of poems, entitled Behind Us the Way Grows Wider, appeared in 2012.

She has devoted most of her career to the teaching of writing and the improvement of writing instruction.  In addition to her dozen books on writing, she has written instructional and feature articles for Writer's Digest magazine and The Writer magazine.  She founded WritingItReal.com, where she provides an online instructional magazine for those who write from personal experience and offers individual as well as online group writing instruction.

Bender provided the prompts to the innovative journaling software LifeJournal with Chronicles Software, which helps writers not only generate interesting journal content, but organize and retrieve their ideas.  She is also a regular instructor, panelist, and presenter at writing and educational conferences, including at Centrum Foundation in Port Townsend, Washington, and many locations where annual Writing It Real conferences have been held, such as Port Townsend; Oracle, Arizona; Nashville, Tennessee; and Istanbul, Turkey.

Bender is well known for her three-step response method that helps authors receive response from trusted listeners, which empowers authors' efforts at revision rather than have them feel their work is being "critiqued" or "torn apart," as the root of that word implies. Authors, she believes, can improve their writing and best fix their drafts after they have heard 1) the words and phrases that stick in the listeners' /readers' ears, 2a) the feelings listeners/readers have after hearing/reading a piece that they feel are in keeping with what the author attempted, 2b) the feelings that are in the way of fully appreciating the work such as places of confusion and feeling left out, and 3) curiosities, where the audience wishes to know.

Education
Bender graduated from the University of Wisconsin with a degree in English and earned an MAT in Secondary Education from Keane College and an MA in Creative Writing from the University of Washington.  Her poems, essays, and reviews have appeared in anthologies, newspapers, and literary magazines around North America, including The Bellingham Review, Northwest Passage, Poetry Northwest, The Seattle Times, and the Women's Studies Quarterly.

She lives and works in Port Townsend, Washington.

Publications

Books on writing
Writing in a New Convertible with the Top Down: A Unique Guide for Writers (with Christi Killien), 1992.
The Writer's Journal, 1996.
The Writer's Journal: 40 Contemporary Writer's and Their Journals, 1997.
Writing Personal Poetry: Creating Poems from Your Life Experiences, 1999.
A Year in the Life: Journaling for Self-Discovery, 2000.
Keeping a Journal You Love, 2001.
Writing Personal Essays: How to Shape Your Life Experiences for the Page, 2002.
Writing and Publishing Your Essays, 2003.
Writing and Publishing Personal Essays, 2005.
Perfect Phrases for College Application Essays, 2008.
Creative Writing DeMystified, 2010

Memoir
A New Theology: Turning to Poetry in a Time of Grief 2009.

Poetry
' 'Since Then: Poems and Short Prose, 2022.
' 'Behind Us the Way Grows Wider, 2013
Sustenance: New and Selected Poems, 1999.
Love from the Coastal Route: Poems, 1991.
Near the Light, 1983.

Anthologies
Boomer Girls, 1999
We Used to Be Wives, 2002
Washington State Poets Association Anthology, 2004
Women Writing on Family, 2011 
Women on Poetry, 2012

Software
LifeJournal for Writers with Chronicles Software

References

External links

Biography 
Profile
Interview
Instructional articles
Article on craft 
Guest blog
LifeJournal website

1945 births
Poets from Virginia
American memoirists
American women memoirists
University of Washington College of Arts and Sciences alumni
Writers from Port Townsend, Washington
Living people
American women poets
20th-century American poets
21st-century American poets
American women essayists
20th-century American women writers
21st-century American women writers
20th-century American essayists
21st-century American essayists
Poets from Washington (state)
Writers from Richmond, Virginia